Too Much Beef is a 1936 American Western film written and directed by Robert F. Hill and starring Rex Bell, Constance Bergen, Forrest Taylor, Lloyd Ingraham, Marjorie O'Connell and Vincent Dennis. The film was released on June 6, 1936, by Grand National Films Inc.

Plot

Cast              
Rex Bell as Johnny Argyle / Tucson Smith
Constance Bergen as Ruth Brown 
Forrest Taylor as Hugh Stanford / Rocky Brown
Lloyd Ingraham as Dynamite Murray
Marjorie O'Connell as Sheila Murray 
Vincent Dennis as Senator Rogge
George Ball as Tracy Paine
Jimmy Aubrey as Shorty Rawlins
John Cowell as George Thompson 
Fred Burns as Judge
Steve Clark as Prosecutor
Horace Murphy as Sheriff

References

External links
 

1936 films
1930s English-language films
American Western (genre) films
1936 Western (genre) films
Grand National Films films
Films directed by Robert F. Hill
American black-and-white films
1930s American films